Michelle Harrison may refer to:
 Michelle Harrison (writer)
 Michelle Harrison (actress)